William Reid was an English professional rugby league footballer who played in the 1910s and 1920s. He played at representative level for Great Britain (non-Test matches), and England, and at club level for Widnes.

Reid won a cap for England while at Widnes in 1914 against Wales. Reid played in Widnes' victory in the Lancashire County League during the 1919–20 season. He was then selected for Great Britain while at Widnes for the 1920 Great Britain Lions tour of Australia and New Zealand.

References

External links
Statistics at rugby.widnes.tv

England national rugby league team players
English rugby league players
Great Britain national rugby league team players
Place of birth missing
Place of death missing
Widnes Vikings players
Year of birth missing
Year of death missing